The National Perspective is one of Belize's five national newspapers, and the only one not to operate from Belize City, having its headquarters in Belmopan.

The Perspective was formed in August 2008 and is thought to represent the views of a certain section of the People's United Party (PUP); however, it considers itself independent.

Rivalry with Amandala 
The National Perspective has consistently called out the nation's leading newspaper, Amandala, and the Kremandala Ltd. media franchise, specifically Amandala publisher Evan X Hyde, for alleged poor journalism and partisan writing.

Amandala has responded selectively, deflecting the criticism and turning it into a larger discussion about the future of Belizean journalism.

People 
Assistant Editor: Saida Silva
 Columnists: Rhenae Nunez, G. Michael Reid, Marshall Nunez, Nuri Muhammad, others (anonymous)
 Contributors: Godfrey Smith, Keisha Milligan, Glenn Tillett, Gordon Smith.

Weekly newspapers published in Belize
Newspapers established in 2008